Air Accidents Investigation Institute (AAII, ÚZPLN) is the Czech Republic government agency investigating aviation accidents and incidents. It is headquartered in Letňany, 18th district, Prague.

History
On 14 October 2002, the Czech government passed resolution no.1006, which approved the statutes of the AAII and appointed Pavel Štrůbl as the agency's first managing director. The AAII began on 1 January 2003. Formerly the Civil Aviation Authority had the accident investigation competencies of the current AAII.

The AAII was established with the Czech name originally being Ústav pro odborně technické zjišťování příčin leteckých nehod since January 2003. In July 2006, was renamed ("odborné" instead of "odborně technické") to its current Czech name. The organization has had the same English name since its inception.

References

External links

 Air Accidents Investigation Institute
 Air Accidents Investigation Institute (Czech)
 Zákon č. 49/1997 Sb., o civilním letectví (Civil Aviation Act), current wording, see § 55a. ÚZPLN established by 258/2002 Sb., renamed by 225/2006 Sb.

Government agencies of the Czech Republic
Aviation organizations based in the Czech Republic
Czech Republic
2003 establishments in the Czech Republic
Organizations based in Prague